Berthillon is a French manufacturer and retailer of luxury ice cream and sorbet, with its primary store on the Île Saint-Louis, in Paris, France. The company is owned and operated by the Chauvin family, descendants of the eponymous Monsieur Berthillon, who from 1954 operated a café and hotel called "Le Bourgogne". 

The ice cream shop became famous in 1961 when a French restaurant guide Gault Millau wrote about "this astonishing ice cream shop hidden in a bistro on the Ile Saint-Louis." They are known for using fresh and high quality ingredients  and keep the recipe of their sorbet (i.e. the proportion of milk and egg) secret. 

Raymond Berthillon, founder of Berthillon, died on 9 August 2014.

References

External links

  

Shops in Paris
Food manufacturers of France
French brands
Ice cream parlors
Buildings and structures in the 4th arrondissement of Paris
Companies based in Paris
Restaurants established in 1954
Ice cream brands
Île Saint-Louis
1954 establishments in France
Sorbets